The DFW B.I (factory designation MD 14), was one of the earliest German aircraft to see service during World War I, and one of the numerous "B-class" unarmed, two-seat observation biplanes of the German military in 1914, but with a distinctive appearance that differentiated it from contemporaries. Though a biplane, its crescent-planform three-bay wings were inspired by that of the earlier Rumpler Taube monoplane, and led to the DFW aircraft being named the Fliegende Banane ("Flying Banana") by its pilots.

The B.II was similar but was built as a trainer. Some were fitted with the more powerful Mercedes D.II engine.

Specifications (DFW B.I)

See also

References

Bibliography

1910s German military reconnaissance aircraft
B.I
Biplanes
Single-engined tractor aircraft
Aircraft first flown in 1914